Edward ("Ted") Hance Shortliffe (born 1947) is a Canadian-born American biomedical informatician, physician, and computer scientist. Shortliffe is a pioneer in the use of artificial intelligence in medicine. He was the principal developer of the clinical expert system MYCIN, one of the first rule-based artificial intelligence expert systems, which obtained clinical data interactively from a physician user and was used to diagnose and recommend treatment for severe infections. While never used in practice (because it preceded the era of local-area networking and could not be integrated with patient records and physician workflow), its performance was shown to be comparable to and sometimes more accurate than that of Stanford infectious disease faculty. This spurred the development of a wide range of activity in the development of rule-based expert systems, knowledge representation, belief nets and other areas, and its design greatly influenced the subsequent development of computing in medicine.

He is also regarded as a founder of the field of biomedical informatics, and in 2006 received one of its highest honors, the Morris F. Collen Award given by the American College of Medical Informatics.

He has held administrative positions in academic medicine, research and national bodies including the Institute of Medicine, American College of Physicians, the National Science Foundation, National Institutes of Health, and National Library of Medicine (NLM), and been influential in the development of medicine, computing and biomedical informatics nationally and internationally. His interests include the broad range of issues related to integrated medical decision-support systems and their implementation, biomedical informatics and medical education and training, and the Internet in medicine.

In March 2007, he became founding dean of the University of Arizona's College of Medicine - Phoenix campus. He stepped down from this position in May 2008 and in January 2009 transferred his primary academic appointment to Arizona State University where he became professor of biomedical informatics. He maintained a secondary appointment as professor of basic medical sciences and of medicine at the University of Arizona College of Medicine (Phoenix Campus). In November 2009 he transferred his academic home to a part-time appointment as professor at the School of Biomedical Informatics, University of Texas Health Science Center at the Texas Medical Center in Houston, where he lived until November 2011. Since that time he has returned to New York City, where he continues as an adjunct professor of biomedical informatics at Columbia University.

In July 2009, Shortliffe assumed a position as president and chief executive officer of the American Medical Informatics Association, an organization that he helped to form between 1988 and 1990 when he was President of the Symposium on Computer Applications in Medical Care. In late 2011 he announced his intention to step down from this position in 2012.

Biography and career 
Shortliffe grew up in Edmonton, Alberta, until his family moved to Connecticut when he was 6. He attended the Loomis School in Connecticut (now Loomis Chaffee School) and later Gresham's School in the United Kingdom. His father was a physician and hospital administrator; his mother, an English teacher. He has one brother and one sister.

As an undergraduate at Harvard, he started working in the computer laboratory of G. Octo Barnett at Massachusetts General Hospital and realized that he could have a career spanning both medicine and computing.

After receiving an AB in applied mathematics magna cum laude from Harvard College in 1970, he received an M.D. (1976) and Ph.D. in Medical Information Systems (1975) from Stanford University, with a dissertation on the MYCIN system, for which he also won the 1976 Grace Murray Hopper Award for outstanding computer scientists under the age of 30. He completed internal medicine house-staff training from 1976-1979 at Massachusetts General Hospital and Stanford Hospital. In 1979 he joined the Stanford faculty in internal medicine and computer science, where he directed the Stanford University Medical EXpertimental computer resource (SUMEX) and subsequently the Center for Advanced Medical Informatics at Stanford (CAMIS), continuing his work on expert systems, including ONCOCIN (an oncology decision support program), T-HELPER, and other projects in the Stanford Heuristic Programming Project. He also simultaneously served as chief of general internal medicine and associate chair of medicine for primary care, and was principal investigator of the InterMed Collaboratory, which developed the science of computable guidelines for medical decision support.

In 1980 he founded one of the earliest formal degree programs in biomedical informatics at Stanford University, emphasizing a rigorous and experimentalist approach. From 2003-2007 he served on the Board of Directors of Medco Health Solutions, a large pharmacy benefits manager headquartered in Franklin Lakes, New Jersey.

In 2000 he moved to Columbia University as chair of the department of biomedical informatics, deputy vice president (Columbia University Medical Center), senior associate dean for strategic information resources (College of Physicians and Surgeons), professor of medicine, professor of computer science, and director of medical informatics services for the New York-Presbyterian Hospital. He continued work on decision support guidelines including the development of the Guideline Interchange Format (GLIF3).

From March 2007 until May 2008 he served as the founding dean of the Phoenix campus of the University of Arizona's College of Medicine and from November 2009 to October 2011 he served as professor in the School of Biomedical Informatics at the University of Texas Health Sciences Center in Houston, Texas. He has served as president and chief executive officer of the American Medical Informatics Association from 2009-2012 and continues to hold adjunct faculty appointments in biomedical informatics at Columbia University and Arizona State University.

Advisory activities 
At age 39, Shortliffe was elected to the Institute of Medicine of the United States National Academy of Sciences (where he has served on the IOM executive council). He is also an elected member or fellow of the American Association for Artificial Intelligence, American Society for Clinical Investigation, the Association of American Physicians, and the American Clinical and Climatological Association.

He is a founding member of the American Medical Informatics Association and was one of five founding fellows of the American College of Medical Informatics. He is a master of the American College of Physicians and was a member of that organization's Board of Regents from 1996-2002. He is editor-in-chief of the Journal of Biomedical Informatics and serves on the editorial boards for several other biomedical informatics publications.

He has served on the oversight committee for the Division of Engineering and Physical Sciences (National Academy of Sciences) and the Biomedical Informatics Expert Panel (National Center for Research Resources at the National Institutes of Health). He also served on the National Committee for Vital and Health Statistics (NCVHS) and on the President's Information Technology Advisory Committee. Earlier he served on the Computer Science and Telecommunications Board (National Research Council), the Biomedical Library Review Committee (National Library of Medicine), and was recipient of a research career development award from the latter agency.

In 2015, he chaired a campaign to raise funds for a new AMIA Doctoral Dissertation Award, highlighting the best doctoral theses in the field of biomedical informatics. The first dissertation awards were made in 2017.

He is the author of more than 300 publications including seven books.

Honors 
 Morris F. Collen Award for Distinguished Contributions to Medical Informatics, American Medical Informatics Association, November 2006
 Appointed Rolf H. Scholdager Professor of Biomedical Informatics, Columbia University, June 2005
 National Associate, National Academies, Washington, DC, December 2004.
 Mastership, American College of Physicians, November 2002
 Young Investigator Award, Western Society for Clinical Investigation, February 1987.
 Henry J. Kaiser Family Foundation Faculty Scholar in General Internal Medicine, July 1983—June 1988.
 Research Career Development Award, National Library of Medicine, July 1979—June 1984.
 Grace Murray Hopper Award (Distinguished computer scientist under age 30), Association for Computing Machinery, October 1976.

Books and Representative Papers 
 Shortliffe, E.H. Computer-Based Medical Consultations: MYCIN, Elsevier/North Holland, New York, 1976. (Japanese-language version by Bunkodo Blue Books, Tokyo, 1981, translated by T. Kaminuma)
 Buchanan, B.G. and Shortliffe, E.H. (eds). Rule-Based Expert Systems: The MYCIN Experiments of the Stanford Heuristic Programming Project. Reading, MA: Addison-Wesley, 1984. See http://aaai.org/AITopics/RuleBasedExpertSystems.
 Clancey, W.J. and Shortliffe, E.H. (eds). Readings in Medical Artificial Intelligence: The First Decade. Reading, MA: Addison-Wesley, 1984.  See http://aaai.org/AITopics/ReadingsInMedicalArtificialIntelligence.
 Shortliffe, E.H., Wulfman, C.E., Rindfleisch, T.C., and Carlson, R.W. An Integrated Oncology Workstation. Bethesda, MD: National Cancer Institute, 1991. [Received the 1991-92 Award of Excellence from The Society for Technical Communication.]
 Shortliffe, E.H. (ed) and Cimino, J.J. (assoc. ed.). Biomedical Informatics: Computer Applications in Health Care and Biomedicine. New York: Springer-Verlag, 2006. (3rd edition; 2nd edition in 2000; 1st edition in 1990 (Addison Wesley)).
 Boxwala AA, Peleg M, Tu S, Ogunyemi O, Zeng QT, Wang D, Patel VL, Greenes RA, Shortliffe EH. `GLIF3: a representation format for sharable computer-interpretable clinical practice guidelines.' Journal of Biomedical Informatics 2004;37(3):147-161.
 Shortliffe, E.H. and Buchanan, B.G.  A model of inexact reasoning in medicine.  Math. Biosci. 1975;23:351-379.
 Duda, R.O. and Shortliffe, E.H.  Expert systems research.  Science, 1983;220:261-268.
 Greenes, R.A. and Shortliffe, E.H.  Medical informatics: an emerging academic discipline and institutional priority. JAMA 1990;263:1114-1120.  See http://jama.jamanetwork.com/pdfaccess.ashx?ResourceID=517040&PDFSource=13
 Detmer, W.M. and Shortliffe, E.H.  Using the Internet to improve knowledge diffusion in medicine. Commun ACM, 1997;40(8):101-108.
 Shortliffe EH.  Strategic Action in Health Information Technology:  Why the Obvious Has Taken So Long.  Health Affairs  2005;24:1222-1233.
 Shortliffe EH.  Biomedical informatics in the education of physicians.  J Am Med Assoc  2010:304(11):1227-1228.

References

External links 
 
 Video of Morris Collen award ceremony
 Tree of Shortliffe's students

1947 births
Living people
Scientists from Edmonton
Writers from Edmonton
University of Texas faculty
Harvard School of Engineering and Applied Sciences alumni
American bioinformaticians
Health informaticians
Stanford University School of Medicine alumni
University of Arizona faculty
Arizona State University faculty
American technology writers
Fellows of the Association for the Advancement of Artificial Intelligence
American people of Canadian descent
Members of the National Academy of Medicine